Korpilombolo is a locality situated in Pajala Municipality, Norrbotten County, Sweden with 529 inhabitants in 2010.

The band Goat claim to be from this town.

The dungeon synth project Skymning is from Korpilombolo.

References

External links

Populated places in Pajala Municipality
Norrbotten
Populated places in Arctic Sweden